Cassie van der Merwe (born 11 July 1973) is a South African cricketer. He played in eighteen first-class and thirteen List A matches from 1994/95 to 1998/99.

References

External links
 

1973 births
Living people
South African cricketers
Border cricketers
Free State cricketers
Cricketers from Johannesburg